Mass media in Norway outlines the current state of the press, television, radio, film and cinema, and social media in Norway.

Press 
Reporters Without Borders ranks Norway 1st in its Worldwide Press Freedom Index. Freedom of the press in Norway dates back to the constitution of 1814. Most of the Norwegian press is privately owned and self-regulated; however, the state provides press support.

Television 

The two companies dominating the Norwegian terrestrial broadcast television are the government-owned NRK (with four main services, NRK1, NRK2, NRK3 and NRK Super) and TV2 (with TV 2 Filmkanalen, TV 2 Nyhetskanalen, TV 2 Sport, TV 2 Zebra and TV 2 Livsstil). Other, long-running channels are TVNorge and TV3.

Radio 

National radio is dominated by the public-service company NRK, which is funded from the television licence fee payable by the owners of television sets. NRK provides programming on three radio channels – NRK P1, NRK P2, and NRK P3 – broadcast on FM and via DAB. A number of further specialist channels are broadcast exclusively on DAB, DVB-T, and the internet including Radio Norway Direct Norway's new English language Radio Station.

Additionally, there are a number of commercial radio stations as well as local radio stations run by various non-profit organizations.

Social media

As of August 2009, it was estimated that 1,156,000 Norwegians use Facebook. For comparison, the total number of inhabitants is about 4,830,000.

Institutions 
Institutions within organized labour are the Norwegian Union of Journalists, the Association of Norwegian Editors and the Norwegian Media Businesses' Association—these are organized in the umbrella Norwegian Press Association. The Press Association is responsible for Pressens Faglige Utvalg, which oversees the Ethical Code of Practice for the Norwegian Press. The Broadcasting Council oversees the state-owned Norwegian Broadcasting Corporation. The Norwegian Media Authority contributes to the enforcement government regulations.

Media bias

As with other related countries, the Norwegian media is often criticized of being biased towards the political left. Political scientist Frank Aarebrot claims to present evidence of this in terms of both Norwegian journalists and editors. Aarebrot has said that "it is serious when Norwegian journalists massively support the political left, but it is a bit more serious when it actually to a greater degree applies to Norwegian editors than among the journalists". He also expressed concern that journalists who sympathise with the Progress Party may have a lesser chance to get hired than journalists with political sympathies close to editors.

For instance, in the actual 2009 election, the Progress Party received 41 mandates, while by journalists it would have received none. The Christian Democratic Party and Center Party would also have been left without representation, while the revolutionary socialist party Red would enter parliament with 9 mandates. The Socialist Left and Liberal Party would also receive significant gains. In 2003, as much as 36% of Norwegian journalists said they would vote for the Socialist Left Party alone, with only 25% saying that they would vote for any of the right-of-center Liberal, Christian Democratic, Conservative or Progress Party combined. News commentator Frank Rossavik once said that if a journalist would stand forward as a Progress Party voter, it would have been "social suicide", and more devastating than withdrawing from the Norwegian Union of Journalists.

Norwegian editors have as well been proven to have leftist political views, with a 2008 survey showing that the Labour Party would have been given a majority in parliament alone with 85 representatives.

The notion of political bias based on the sum of individuals' party selection has been criticized. Among others, conservative historian and politician Francis Sejersted holds that the general media is neither left-slanted nor right-slanted, but "media-slanted". This means that media across the political spectrum have a tendency to choose the same angle on a case, focusing on personification and dramatic events.

See also 
Communications in Norway
Culture of Norway
Internet in Norway
 Open access in Norway

Lists
List of Norwegian newspapers
List of Norwegian magazines
List of Norwegian television channels
List of Norwegian-language radio stations
List of Norwegian writers

References

Further reading

in English

in Norwegian
Encyclopedias

Books

External links
 

 
Norway